Saltery Bay Provincial Park is a provincial park in British Columbia, Canada, located southeast of the city of Powell River, and on the north side of the entrance to Jervis Inlet in the central area of that province's Sunshine Coast region.

References

External links
  Saltery Bay Provincial Park - BC Parks

Sunshine Coast (British Columbia)
Provincial parks of British Columbia
Protected areas established in 1962
1962 establishments in British Columbia